This is a list of members of the unicameral National Assembly of Hungary according to the results of the elections of 1945.  This was the first legislature in Hungary's history to be freely and fairly elected by full and universal suffrage, while an additional twelve public dignitaries were rewarded honorary mandates in the new parliament. It would be the last such parliament until 1990.

Composition

At the opening of Parliament

At the closing of Parliament

Government

List of members
Members and their parties upon the opening of Parliament, 29 November 1945.  
 Independent Smallholders' Party
 Hungarian Communist Party
 National Peasant Party
 Social Democratic Party
 Civic Democratic Party 
 Independents

Source:

Notes

Sources

1945